Purshottam Khandelwal is an Indian politician. He is member of 18th Uttar Pradesh Assembly and was also elected to the 17th Uttar Pradesh Assembly from Agra North in the by-election in 2019 as a member of the Bharatiya Janata Party.

References

Living people
Bharatiya Janata Party politicians from Uttar Pradesh
Politicians from Agra
1961 births
Uttar Pradesh MLAs 2022–2027